NJ2 is a class of diesel-electric locomotives employed by China Railway. Built in Erie, Pennsylvania, it is based on a standard GE Transportation Systems GE Dash 9-44CW and marketed as GE C38AChe. It was specially customised for high altitude operation on the Qinghai-Tibet Railway route. It is used on the Qingzang Railway that connects Xining, Qinghai Province, to Lhasa, Tibet Autonomous Region, in the People's Republic of China. It is a  Co-Co design (Railway Magazine Dec 2006 p36).

See also
 C38Emi, a variant of GE Dash 9-44CW operating in Brazil
 GE C36-7, operated by CR as ND5 locomotives
 China Railways HXN5, GE Evolution ES-59ACi
China Railways HXN3, another type of locomotive used for Tibet route, built by EMD.

External links

 

NJ2
Co-Co locomotives
General Electric locomotives
Standard gauge locomotives of China